A Fence lizard can be any of several species of spiny lizard (genus Sceloporus), especially:

The eastern fence lizard or northern fence lizard, Sceloporus undulatus
The western fence lizard, Sceloporus occidentalis

Note that there are many other species in the Spiny Lizard genus, Sceloporus.

Animal common name disambiguation pages